Delphian is a progressive metal band from Netherlands.

History
Delphian was founded at 2003 by Roel van Helden of Sun Caged and Coert Bouten. A demo was released in 2004. In 2005, the band signed with Lion Music and released its first album, Oracle. In 2007, the band released its second album under Lion Music entitled Unravel.

Discography

Albums
Demo (2004, Self-Produced)
Oracle (2005, Lion Music)
Unravel (2007, Lion Music)

Line-up

Current members
Aniek Janssen - vocals/flute
Coert Bouten - guitar
Marcel Volleberg - guitar
Sjoerd Hoeijmakers - bass
Roel van Helden - drums

Session members

Joost van den Broek - keyboards (Oracle)
Rene Kroon - piano & keyboards (Unravel)
Leon Brouwer - vocals (Unravel)

External links
Official Website
Myspace

Musical groups established in 2003
Dutch progressive metal musical groups
Musical quintets